Major Jackson (born in Philadelphia, Pennsylvania) is an American poet and professor at Vanderbilt University. He is the author of five collections of poetry: The Absurd Man (W.W. Norton, 2020), Roll Deep (W.W. Norton, 2015), Holding Company (W.W. Norton, 2010), Hoops (W.W. Norton, 2006), finalist for an NAACP Image Award for Outstanding Literature-Poetry, and Leaving Saturn (University of Georgia, 2002), winner of the 2000 Cave Canem Poetry Prize and finalist for a National Book Critics Award Circle. His edited volumes include: Best American Poetry 2019, Renga for Obama, and Library of America's Countee Cullen: Collected Poems.

Life
He earned degrees from Temple University and the University of Oregon. Major Jackson is the Gertrude Conaway Vanderbilt Chair in the Humanities at Vanderbilt University. From 2002 until 2020, he taught at the University of Vermont as the Richard A. Dennis Professor of English and University Distinguished Professor. He is a former graduate faculty member of the New York University Creative Writing Program and the Bennington Writing Seminars. He serves as the Poetry Editor of The Harvard Review.

His poems and essays have appeared in The American Poetry Review, The New Yorker, The Paris Review, Ploughshares, Poetry London, Orion Magazine, The Yale Review, among other fine publications. His poetry has received critical attention in The Boston Globe, Christian Science Monitor, The New York Times, World Literature Today, Philadelphia Inquirer, and on National Public Radio's All Things Considered. His work has been included in many anthologies including The Best American Poetry 2004 (Scribner, 2004), The Pushcart Prize XXIX: Best of the Small Presses, (W.W. Norton & Company, 2004) Schwerkraft, From the Fishouse (Persea Books, 2009),  and The Word Exchange: Anglo-Saxon Poems in Translation (W.W. Norton & Company, 2010).

Honors and awards
A recipient of fellowships from the Fine Arts Work Center in Provincetown, Guggenheim Foundation and National Endowment for the Arts, his awards include a Pushcart Prize, a Whiting Award, a Pew Fellowship in the Arts, and a Witter Bynner Fellowship in conjunction with the Library of Congress. He also served as poet-in-residence at The Frost Place, creative arts fellow at the Radcliffe Institute for Advanced Study at Harvard University, Jack Kerouac Writer-in-Residence at the University of Massachusetts Lowell, and Sidney Harman Writer-in-Residence at Baruch College.

Poetry collections

References

External links
 
 Profile at The Whiting Foundation
 WW Norton Author Page
 Video:Interview with Major Jackson at the NYS Writers Institute in 2008
 Interview: Major Jackson Interview on Identity Theory

American male poets
Central High School (Philadelphia) alumni
Living people
Writers from Philadelphia
Poets from Pennsylvania
Poets from Vermont
Temple University alumni
University of Oregon alumni
The New Yorker people
University of Vermont faculty
Writers from Burlington, Vermont
Pew Fellows in the Arts
1968 births